Colonel Henry Gariepy (1930–2010) was a Salvation Army officer and the former national editor in chief and literary secretary for The Salvation Army which included The War Cry. He retired in 1995. He held many other positions within the Army such as corps officer and youth camp coordinating officer in various locations in the USA. He continued to be very active though retired in the Salvation Army as a speaker, literary consultant, conference speaker and college teacher at the School for Officer Training in Suffern, New York, where new Salvation Army officers participate in a two-year educational program.

He was married to retired officer Colonel Marjorie Gariepy with four children, twelve grandchildren and a growing number of great-grand children. He died on Saturday, April 3, 2010.

Awards
He received the Order of the Founder in July 2007 - the highest honor that can be conferred by The Salvation Army

Notable works
Today, he is better known for his many publications; he is the author of more than 29 books and contributor to more than 50 works, ranging from devotional works to biography and history. One of his best known titles includes 100 Portraits of Christ. This work has been produced in nine editions, in several languages and also had 150,000 copies printed for Billy Graham.

Works include:

 Portraits of Perseverance
 Songs in the Night: Inspiring Stories behind 100 Hymns Born in Trial and Suffering
 Daily Meditations on Golden Texts of the Bible
 Man with a Mission
 When Life Gets Tough
 Light in a Dark Place
 Treasure from the Psalms
 Andy Miller: A legend and a Legacy
 A Salvationist Treasury
 Mobilized for God: History of the salvation Army Vol 8
 A Century of Service In Alaska
 A Pen of Flame (editor)
 Healing in the HeartLand
 Guidebook for Writer and Editors
 40 days with the Saviour
 Challenge and Response
 General of God's Army

He has released a biography on Israel Gaither. "Israel L. Gaither: Man With a Mission" (2006) and now "Christianity in Action: The International History of The Salvation Army" (2009)

References

American Salvationists
Salvation Army officers
2010 deaths
Cleveland State University alumni
Protestant writers
1930 births